Claire Fahey (born 19 June 1991) is a British real tennis player.

Career

Fahey became the youngest world champion for real tennis in 2011 when she was 19. She won again in 2013, 2015, 2017 and 2019. She also won the doubles championships in 2011, 2013, 2015 and 2017 alongside her sister Sarah Vigrass and again in 2019 alongside Tara Lumley.

She won the British Opens every year between 2010 and 2019; the French Opens every year between 2010 and 2018; the US Opens in 2008, 2010, 2011, 2012, 2013, 2014, 2017 and 2018; and won the Australian Opens in 2010, 2011, 2012, 2014, 2016, 2017, 2018 and 2019.

Personal life

Fahey has a twin sister Sarah and is married to fellow real tennis player Robert Fahey and they have two children.

References

1991 births
Living people
Real tennis players
British sportswomen